Bonino is a thirty-minute ethnic situation comedy television series starring Ezio Pinza. Originating in the Hudson Theatre in New York City, the program aired live on NBC from September 12 to December 26, 1953. The show was also known as I, Bonino, an alternate title that many newspapers and columnists used in place of the official name when the series premiered.

The inspiration for the series was a teleplay Robert Alan Aurthur wrote called Two for One, about a middle-aged widower who raises his children from a distance. It had appeared on an early anthology series, Television Playhouse.

Premise
Babbo Bonino (Ezio Pinza) retires as a traveling concert singer, so he can live at home and help raise his eight motherless children. Columnist Erskine Johnson reported that the "Emphasis will be on human interest, situation comedy, and an occasional song".

A storyline concerning the engagement and marriage of oldest daughter Doris Bonino, intended to play out over four months, had to be accelerated when actress Lenka Peterson became pregnant before the show's premiere.

Cast
The Bonino household
 Ezio Pinza – Babbo Bonino
 Mary Wickes – Martha (housekeeper)
 Conrad Janis – Edward Bonino (oldest child, doesn't appear until episode 5)
 Lenka Peterson – Doris Bonino (oldest daughter)
 Chet Allen – Pietro "Jerry" Bonino
 Oliver Andes – Carlo Bonino
 Gaye Huston – Fancesca Bonino
 Lucille Graygor – Angela Bonino
 Paul Jonali –  Michael Bonino
 Van Dyke Parks – Andrew Bonino (youngest child, first appears in episode 4)

Others
 David Opatoshu – Walter Rogers (Bonino's show business manager)
 Mike Kellin – Rusty (Bonino's valet)
 Donald Harris – Took over the role of Rusty on November 18, 1953.
 Anthony Eisley – John Clinton

Production
NBC announced the show would be on its fall schedule, with Pinza starring, in mid-August 1953. The signing of Mary Wickes, Mike Kellin, and David Opatoshu to the cast was reported a few days later. The projected budget for eight children proved expensive enough that producer Fred Coe reportedly considered cutting down the cast. The solution was to turn two of the child characters (portrayed by Lucille Graygor and Paul Jonali) into non-speaking roles, essentially making them "extras" with much lower pay. Only six of Bonino's children would have speaking parts. An additional expense dodge was that the oldest and youngest children, Edward and Andrew, did not appear until episodes 5 and 4 respectively.

Thomas Phipps and Robert Alan Aurthur created Bonino, and Aurthur was the program's writer. Fred Coe was the producer, and Gordon Duff was the director. Donald Voorhees conducted the live orchestra for each episode. The show's theme music was composed by Ezio Pinza and arranged by Ardon Cornwell.

Response
After the premiere aired, Kay Gardella in the New York Daily News said that Pinza acquitted himself well as an actor, while "the first installment, while not brilliant, proved promising". However, columnist Jack O'Brian felt the premiere episode was overburdened with comedy cliches, and that the series would stand or fall on Pinza's personal appeal. Columnist Dwight Newton noted how similar were the first episode premises of Bonino and another new series called Make Room for Daddy; in each case a professional singer decides to stay home with the children he's been neglecting.

Broadcast history
Bonino debuted at 8 p.m. Eastern on Saturday, September 12, 1953, just after Ethel and Albert and before Ted Mack's The Original Amateur Hour. The starting date meant its premiere episode would go against the CBS summer replacement series The Larry Storch Show, giving it a week's grace before the return of The Jackie Gleason Show.

Since the show was broadcast live, stations on the NBC network in the Central and Mountain time zones saw it at 7 p.m. and 6 p.m. respectively. Stations not on the network feed, including those in the Pacific time zone, received a kinescope copy a week later.

Bonino was sponsored by Philip Morris cigarettes and Lady Esther cosmetics. It was replaced by a Spike Jones program.

Episodes

Notes

References

External links 
 

1953 American television series debuts
1953 American television series endings
1950s American sitcoms
NBC original programming
Black-and-white American television shows
American live television series